James Soloman Biery (March 2, 1839 – December 3, 1904) was a Republican member of the U.S. House of Representatives from Pennsylvania.

James S. Biery was born on a farm in Venango County, Pennsylvania near Emlenton.  He attended district schools and Emlenton Academy. He taught school for three years in the oil regions of Pennsylvania.

In 1861, he moved to Allentown, Pennsylvania, where he continued teaching for eight years. He studied theology for two years, and subsequently studied law.  He was admitted to the bar in 1868 and commenced practice in Allentown.  He served as a member of the Pennsylvania State House of Representatives in 1869.

Biery was elected as a Republican to the Forty-third Congress.  He was not a candidate for renomination in 1874.  He resumed the practice of law at Allentown and also engaged in literary pursuits.  He died in Allentown in 1904 and was interred in Fairview Cemetery in Allentown.

Sources

James Soloman Biery at The Political Graveyard

1839 births
1904 deaths
People from Venango County, Pennsylvania
Republican Party members of the United States House of Representatives from Pennsylvania
Republican Party members of the Pennsylvania House of Representatives
Politicians from Allentown, Pennsylvania
19th-century American politicians